Al Rehayya is a village in Qatar located in the municipality of Al Daayen.

Nearby settlements include Al Heedan in Al Khor Municipality to the north, Umm Swayya in Al Khor Municipality to the west, and Tenbek to the south.

Etymology
The village's name derives from the Arabic word "rehi", meaning "millstone". It received its name from a large, prominent rock in the village that looks similar to a millstone.

References

Populated places in Al Daayen